Mawan may refer to the following towns in China:

Ma Wan, Hong Kong
Mawan, Guizhou, in Dushan County
Mawan, Hubei, in Tianmen, Hubei

See also
Ma Wan (painter)